The 2012 ICC World Cricket League Division Eight was a cricket tournament which took place on 15–22 September 2012 in Samoa. It formed part of the World Cricket League and 2019 Cricket World Cup qualifying.

Teams
The teams that took part in the tournament were decided according to the results of the 2010 ICC World Cricket League Division Eight, the 2011 ICC World Cricket League Division Seven and regional tournaments.

Teams that qualified automatically were:

 (5th in 2011 ICC World Cricket League Division Seven)
 (6th in 2011 ICC World Cricket League Division Seven)
 (3rd in 2010 ICC World Cricket League Division Eight)

The remaining five teams were determined by the ICC Development Committee based on the most recent regional results and other factors.
 
 
 
 
 

Europe's qualifier was determined in a four-team tournament held in June in La Manga, Spain, between Austria, Belgium, France and Gibraltar.

Groups and squads
Group A

Group B

Fixtures

Group stage

Group A

Matches

Group B

Matches

Play-offs

Plate

5th place semifinals

7th Place Playoff

5th Place Playoff

Semifinals and Final

Semifinals

3rd Place Playoff

Final

Statistics

Most runs
The top five run scorers (total runs) are included in this table.

Most wickets
The top five wicket takers (total wickets) are listed in this table.

Final Placings 

After the conclusion of the tournament the teams were distributed as follows:

References 

2012, 8
2012 in Samoan sport
2012 in cricket
Cricket in Samoa